The 12025 / 12026 Pune–Secunderabad Shatabdi Express is a train operated by the Central Railway which is running between Pune Junction in Maharashtra and Secunderabad in Telangana. The train commenced service on 13 November 2011. The train runs at an average speed of 70.58 km/h and is the fastest diesel hauled shatabdi train on IR and also the fastest train connecting these two cities. The train travels from Pune Junction to Secunderabad in 8 hours and 30 mins as 12025 Shatabdi Express (70.23 km/hr) & 8 hours 25 mins as 12026 Shatabdi Express.

Coach composition

It generally carries 2 AC Executive class coach & 9 AC Chair Car coaches in addition to 2 EOG cars. Unlike most Shatabdi's it does not have a pantry car & picks up refreshments & meals from intermediate stops. Like most trains, coach composition may be amended at the discretion of Indian Railways

Starting on 30 July 2014, a brand new LHB rake has been allotted to Pune Secunderabad Shatabdi Express .It also has vistadome coaches attached to it, for the passengers to enjoy the scenic beauties throughout the journey.

Route & Halts
Current timetable:

Traction

Both trains are hauled by a Lallaguda Loco Shed based WAP-7 electric locomotive end to end.

Gallery

References

See also
 Shatabdi Express

Shatabdi Express trains
Rail transport in Maharashtra
Rail transport in Karnataka
Rail transport in Telangana
Transport in Secunderabad
Transport in Pune